The 1953 Coronation Honours in Pakistan, celebrating the coronation of Elizabeth II, Queen of Pakistan, were appointments made by the Queen on the advice of the Government of Pakistan to various orders and honours to reward and highlight good works by Pakistanis. The honours were announced on 1 June 1953.

The recipients of honours are displayed here as they were styled before their new honour.

Knight Bachelor 
 Oliver Gilbert Grace, Esq., C.I.E, O.B.E, Inspector General of Police, Karachi
 Sidney Ridley, Esq., Revenue Commisssioner, Sind

Order of the British Empire

Knight Commander (KBE)
Civil division
 Terrence Bernard Creagh Coen, Esq., C.I.E., Secretary, Cabinet Secretariat

Commander (CBE)
Civil division
 Stephen Benedict Hatch Barnwell, Esq., Commissioner, Civil Supplies, East Bengal
 Thomas Malcolm Oag, Esq., Director of Navigation, Central Engineering Authority

Military division
 Brigadier (temporary) John Tilly (45001), Duke of Cornwall's Light Infantry
 Colonel (temporary) Frederick William Whiteman, O.B.E. (MZ/12128), Pakistan Armed Forces Medical Services

Officer (OBE)
Civil Division
 Francis Ward Allinson, Esq., M.B., B.S., Professor of Surgery, Medical College Hospital, Dacca
 Edward John MacDonald Dent, Esq., Revenue and Divisional Commissioner, North West Frontier Province
 Roger Antony Fitzwilliam Howroyd, Esq., Municipal Commissioner, Karachi
 Alan Ian MacMillan, Esq., Deputy Chief Accounts Officer, East Bengal Railway

Military division
 Lieutenant-Colonel (temporary) Charles William Marr Young (64553), Royal Corps of Signals
 Wing Commander Robert Wentworth Stephen Cross (72126), Royal Air Force
 Wing Commander (acting) Stanley Williams (45871), Royal Air Force

Member (MBE)
Civil Division
 Humphrey Arthington Davy, Esq., Political Agent, Sibi
 Charles Douglas Hewson, Esq., Administrative Officer, Air Headquarters
 Henry James MacDonald, Esq., Grade I Staff Officer, Air Headquarters
 Cecil Mills, Esq., Assistant Secretary, Ministry of Defence
 John Leslie Taylor, Esq., Superintendent of Police (Technical), Punjab

Military division
 Lieutenant-Commander (L) Gordon Walter Bridle, Royal Navy
 Major (temporary) John Long (322042), Pakistan Electrical and) Mechanical Engineers
 Major (temporary) James William Moore (241159), Bedfordshire and Hertfordshire Regiment

Companion of the Imperial Service Order (ISO)
Pakistan Civil Service
Walter Ferdenand Grossman, Esq., Administrative Officer, Directorate-General of Health

References

Coronation Honours
1953 awards
1953 in Pakistan
Honours (Pakistan)